Fred M. Vinson Birthplace, at E. Madison and Vinson Blvd. in Louisa, Kentucky, also known as Old Jailer's House, was listed on the National Register of Historic Places in 1974.

It is an eight-room two-story brick house completed in 1889, built as a Jailer's Residence on the Courthouse Square in Louisa, the county seat of Lawrence County.  It was the birthplace and early home of Fred M. Vinson (January 22, 1890 – September 8, 1953), who became the 13th Chief Justice of the United States.

References

National Register of Historic Places in Lawrence County, Kentucky
Government buildings completed in 1889
1889 establishments in Kentucky
Houses completed in 1889
Houses on the National Register of Historic Places in Kentucky
Government buildings on the National Register of Historic Places in Kentucky
Louisa, Kentucky